Vera Drew is an American editor, director, and writer.

She is a transgender woman and has worked in entertainment television since 2009, including work as an editor for On Cinema, Comedy Bang! Bang! and Who Is America?. In 2019, Drew was nominated for a Primetime Emmy Award in the category Outstanding Picture Editing for Variety Programming for her work on the series Who Is America?.

The crowd-funded film The People's Joker, which was directed by and stars Drew as The Joker, debuted at the 2022 Toronto International Film Festival.

See also
Alternative versions of Joker

References

External links
 
 

Year of birth missing (living people)
American film editors
Living people
Screenwriters from Illinois
Film directors from Illinois
Actors from Illinois
21st-century American actors
21st-century American screenwriters